The 2009–10 Northern Football League season was the 112nd in the history of Northern Football League, a football competition in England.

Division One

Division One featured 19 clubs which competed in the division last season, along with three new clubs, promoted from Division Two:
 Esh Winning
 Horden Colliery Welfare
 Norton & Stockton Ancients

Also, Dunston Federation changed name to Dunston UTS.

League table

Results

Division Two

Division Two featured 16 clubs which competed in the division last season, along with four new clubs:
 Gillford Park, promoted from the Northern Football Alliance
 Newton Aycliffe, promoted from the Wearside Football League
 Northallerton Town, relegated from Division One
 Seaham Red Star, relegated from Division One

Also, Stokesley Sports Club changed name to Stokesley.

League table

Results

References

External links
 Northern Football League official site

Northern Football League seasons
9